Andrew George Lauterstein (born 22 May 1987) is an Australian swimmer and a three-time Olympic medalist.

Personal 
Lauterstein grew up in Black Rock, Victoria and attended Brighton Grammar School.  He has an elder brother and a younger sister.  In his youth, Lauterstein was in the Victorian state football team and represented Australia at baseball in youth teams.  He quit both sports at the age of 16 to concentrate on swimming.  Outside of his swimming life, Lauterstein is a keen aspiring DJ and was one of the 50 nominees for the 2008 Cleo Bachelor of the Year award, which was eventually awarded to Jason Dundas.

2007 World Championships
At the 2007 World Aquatics Championships in Melbourne, Lauterstein qualified 11th in the heats of the 100-metre butterfly in a time of 52.63 seconds.  He managed only a time of 52.99 seconds in the semifinals and was eliminated in 15th place.

In the 4×100-metre freestyle relay, Lauterstein swam the third leg.  Australia was fifth at the start of his leg.  Lauterstein was the second slowest of the third leg swimmers, and Australia were in last place at the end of his 49.17-second split, which was the 19th fastest out of the 24 swimmers who had a flying start.  Australia finished fifth.

In the 4×100-metre medley relay, Lauterstein swam the butterfly leg and started his split with Australia in second place behind Japan. Lauterstein swam the fifth fastest butterfly leg with a split of 52.63 seconds and was overtaken by his Russian counterpart, leaving Australia third at the last change. Eamon Sullivan anchored Australia to gold by overtaking his Japanese and Russian counterparts.

2008 Olympics
In the 2008 Summer Olympics in Beijing, he swam in both the 4×100-metre freestyle relay and the 100-metre butterfly.  He swam the second leg of the final in the 4×100-metre freestyle relay, winning a bronze medal.  In the 100-metre butterfly, Lauterstein swam a personal best and Australian record in each of the three stages, and qualified for the final with the third fastest qualifying time. He took the bronze medal in the final with a time of 51.12 seconds in a race where US sensation Michael Phelps won his 7th gold medal of the Games.  Lauterstein edged out world record holder Ian Crocker for the bronze by just 0.01 of a second.  As of the 2016 Games, he is still the most recent bronze medalist in this event as a result of ties for silver in 2012 and 2016.  Lauterstein also won a silver medal in 4×100-metre medley relay in which he swam the butterfly leg.

Following the Olympics, Lauterstein left his long-term coach Glenn Baker and moved to the New South Wales Institute of Sport under Grant Stoelwinder. Stoelwinder coaches Libby Lenton and Eamon Sullivan the world record holders in the 50- and 100-metre freestyle for women and men respectively.

In January, Lauterstein returned to action contesting the Victorian and New South Wales state championships. He showed tremendous form starting off the year going sub-52 in his signature event with only three weeks preparation.

In March, Lauterstein sent a message at the 2009 Telstra Australian Swimming Championships (world championships trials). He clocked 48.64 in the 100-metre freestyle, missing the individual spot behind Matt Targett by 0.01 of second.  In the 50-metre butterfly, he got revenge against Targett, setting a new Australian record of 23.30, ironically, besting Targett by 0.01 of a second.  His final task was the 100-metre butterfly, after a misleading heats, and semi-finals, Lauterstein clocked 51.13, just missing his Australian record by 0.01 of a second.

2009 World Championships
Day 1 brought the 4×100-metre freestyle relay, and with the absence of Eamon Sullivan and Ashley Callus, Australia were never in medal territory, finishing eighth.  The 100-metre butterfly final saw Lauterstein set an Australian record, but he failed to get on the podium.  After two disappointing finals, he did not leave Rome empty handed, capturing a bronze medal in the 4×100-metre medley relay.  In the preliminaries, he clocked a 50.16, which was the second fastest 100-metre butterfly split in history behind Michael Phelps.

See also
 List of Commonwealth Games medallists in swimming (men)
 List of Olympic medalists in swimming (men)

References

External links
BEST sports - Profile

1987 births
Living people
Australian people of German descent
Olympic swimmers of Australia
Swimmers at the 2008 Summer Olympics
Olympic bronze medalists for Australia
Olympic silver medalists for Australia
Swimmers from Melbourne
Swimmers at the 2006 Commonwealth Games
People educated at Brighton Grammar School
Australian male butterfly swimmers
Australian male freestyle swimmers
Olympic bronze medalists in swimming
World Aquatics Championships medalists in swimming
New South Wales Institute of Sport alumni
Medalists at the 2008 Summer Olympics
Commonwealth Games gold medallists for Australia
Olympic silver medalists in swimming
Commonwealth Games medallists in swimming
People from Black Rock, Victoria
Medallists at the 2006 Commonwealth Games